Skiff Lake is an unincorporated community in York County, New Brunswick, Canada.  The community is on the north-west corner of Skiff Lake.

History

Notable people

See also
List of communities in New Brunswick

References

Communities in York County, New Brunswick